Felice Lifshitz is an American academic historian, who specialises in medieval European history. She is a former editor-in-chief of the peer-reviewed journal History Compass, and serves on the editorial board for The Historian.

Education
Lifshitz graduated from Barnard College (1981) and a Masters (1983) and Ph.D. (1988) from Columbia University.

Selected works

References

External links
Florida International University staff profile

Living people
American medievalists
Women medievalists
Academic journal editors
Barnard College alumni
Columbia University alumni
American women historians
Year of birth missing (living people)
21st-century American women